Fervidobacterium islandicum is a species of extremely thermophilic anaerobic bacteria, first isolated from an Icelandic hot spring.

Biology and biochemistry

Morphology 
F. islandicum cells are Gram-negative motile rods, about 1.8 μm in length, and 0.6 μm in width occurring singly or in pairs. About 50% of cells form large spheroids at one end known as a 'toga' commonly found in members of the phylum Thermotogota (formerly Thermotogae)

Physiology 
F. islandicum isolate H21 grows in a pH range from 6.0 to 8.0 with an optimum at around 7.2. Growth is observed at a temperature range between 40 °C and 80 °C, with an optimum of 70 °C. At a temperature of 65 °C, strain H21 has a doubling time of 150 minutes.

Culture growth 
Growth of isolate H21 requires low amounts (0.3%) of yeast extract. When this is used as a single carbon and energy source, the final cell concentration is 1x107 cells/ml. Growth is strongly enhanced by the addition of 0.2% pyruvate, ribose, glucose, maltose, raffinose, starch and, less efficiently, cellulose. Final cell concentrations with these additions can range from 2 to 5x108. In the presence of glucose, F. islandicum produces the following end products: L(+) lactate, acetate, ethanol, H2 and CO2. Isolate H21 shows a sensitivity to common antibiotics, its growth is inhibited by addition of vancomycin, streptomycin, ampicillin, chloramphenicol and rifampicin at 10 g/ml.

Genomics 
F. islandicum strain AW-1 has a total genome size of 2.4 million base pairs, which is slightly larger than the genomes of other Fervidobacterium strains. It has a G + C content of 40.7%. It contains 2,184 protein coding genes in a total of 2,248 genes.

Environment 
F. islandicum was originally isolated from an Icelandic hot spring on the banks of the river Varma close to Hverageri, Iceland. The anaerobic samples were taken from hot waters and muds. Here, the temperatures were between 70 °C and 102 °C, and the pH was between 1.5 and 9.

Biotechnological applications 
F. islandicum AW-1 is capable of complete feather degradation at 70 °C and a pH of 7. Feather keratin has a very high cysteine content, which makes it very rigid and hard to digest. 5 million tons of chicken feathers are generated by the poultry industry every year, making chicken feathers a serious solid waste problem. Therefore, F. islandicum's ability to degrade native chicken feathers is very appealing.

References

Further reading
 Ravot, Gilles, et al. "L-Alanine production from glucose fermentation by hyperthermophilic members of the domains Bacteria and Archaea: a remnant of an ancestral metabolism?." Applied and Environmental Microbiology 62.7 (1996): 2657-2659.
 Dworkin, Martin, and Stanley Falkow, eds. The Prokaryotes: Vol. 7: Proteobacteria: Delta and Epsilon Subclasses. Deeply Rooting Bacteria. Vol. 7. Springer, 2006.

External links
 
 LPSN
 Type strain of Fervidobacterium islandicum at BacDive -  the Bacterial Diversity Metadatabase

Thermotogota
Gram-positive bacteria
Bacteria described in 1991